Verbatim is a brand for storage media and flash memory products currently owned by CMC Magnetics Corporation (CMC), a Taiwanese company that is known for optical disc manufacturing.  Formerly a subsidiary of Mitsubishi Chemical, the global business and assets of Verbatim were sold to CMC Magnetics in 2019 at an estimated price of $32 million USD.

Originally an American company and known for its floppy disks in the 1970s and 1980s, Verbatim is now known for its recordable optical media.

History
The original Verbatim first started in Mountain View, California, in 1969, under the name Information Terminals Corporation, founded by Reid Anderson. It grew quickly and became a leading manufacturer of floppy disks by the end of the 1970s, and it was soon renamed Verbatim. In 1982, it formed a floppy disk joint venture with Japanese company Mitsubishi Kasei Corporation (forerunner of Mitsubishi Chemical Corporation), with the joint venture called Kasei Verbatim.

Verbatim mostly struggled in the decade and was purchased by Eastman Kodak in 1985, while its floppy partnership with Mitsubishi Kasei Corporation was still intact. It was eventually purchased fully by Mitsubishi Kasei Corporation in March 1990, after eight years in a joint venture. Many new products were launched under the new Japanese ownership, and the brand saw immense growth in the decade. Mitsubishi Kagaku Media was founded in October 1994 as a subsidiary through the merger of Mitsubishi Kasei and Mitsubishi Petrochemical, resulting in Mitsubishi Chemical. The new company absorbed the former American company and created a new Japanese entity, whilst the old Verbatim brand lived on.

In addition, Mitubishi Kagaku Media sold products under the Freecom brand. Freecom was founded in Berlin, Germany, in 1989 and had been based in the Netherlands when it was purchased by Mitsubishi Chemical Holdings in September 2009.

The company was selling products under the Mitsubishi brand in Japan from 1994 to 2010, when Verbatim fully replaced it.

Key dates

 1969: Information Terminals Corporation (ITC), the predecessor to Verbatim, is founded in Mountain View, California, U.S.
 1976: ITC begins manufacturing magnetic tape for use in its cassettes and floppy disks.
 1978: ITC is officially renamed Verbatim.
 1979: Verbatim goes public; sales grow to $36 million.
 1985: Eastman Kodak announces its $174 million bid for Verbatim.
 1990: Mitsubishi Kasei Corporation acquires Verbatim.
 1992: The company buys Carlisle Memory Products.
 1994: Mitsubishi Kasei Corporation and Mitsubishi Petrochemical Co., Ltd merge to create Mitsubishi Chemical Corporation. End of the original Verbatim Corporation as it is turned into a new subsidiary, Mitsubishi Kagaku Media (MKM). Verbatim brand replaced by Mitsubishi in Japan.
 1994: Verbatim enters a joint venture with Sanyo Laser Products.
 1995: Acquires Laser Technologies and Ecotone.
 2005: Mitsubishi Chemical Corporation (MCC) merges with Mitsubishi Pharma Corporation to form Mitsubishi Chemical Holdings Corporation.
 2007: Acquires SmartDisk.
 2009: Acquires Freecom.
 2009: Verbatim brand returns to the Japanese market for the first time since 1994.
 2010: Mitsubishi Kagaku Media unifies all recordable discs products under one umbrella Verbatim brand in the Japanese market.
 2019: Agreement to be bought by CMC.
 2020: CMC acquires Verbatim/Mitsubishi Kagaku Media.

Notable info about historical products

 In 1969, the first digital-grade tape cassettes were released.
 8" diskettes were first released in 1974.
 In 1991, Verbatim released the world's first 3.5" magneto-optical disk.
 Verbatim started its successful foray into the optical disc market in 1993 with CD-R media.
 In 1997, Verbatim released the world's first CD-RW format media.
 In 2001, Verbatim released the world's first DVD+R format media.
 Introduced the first 8.5 GB DVD+R DL products in 2004, followed by DVD-R DL in 2005.
 Verbatim launched a new product range of LED lights in 2010.

Products

Current and former products
 Solid-state drives (SSDs)
 Floppy disks
 Magnetic tapes
 MultiMediaCards
 SD cards
 CompactFlash cards
 CD-R
 CD-RW
 DVD-R
 DVD-RW
 DVD-R DL
 DVD+R
 DVD+RW
 DVD+R DL
 DVD-RAM
 BD-R
 BD-RE
 HD-DVD-R
 USB flash drives
 SIPRELAY Operators
 LED light bulbs
 Gaming Accessories
 Computer mouse
 Keyboards

Manufacturing and marketing
These products are partly produced in Verbatim and Mitsubishi's own plants in Singapore and Japan, and partly under license by Taiwanese and Indian manufacturers.

Their early floppies were manufactured at a factory in Limerick, Republic of Ireland, starting 1979 (MC Infonics, sold to CMC Magnetics in the 2000s).

Verbatim also resells relabeled products from Japanese, Taiwanese, Chinese, Malaysian and Indian factories (Pearl White DVD series in Europe, some CD-R not labeled Super Azo), including but not limited to products by Taiyo Yuden, Ritek Corporation, CMC Magnetics, Prodisc, Moser Baer, Daxon/BenQ.

Technologies
 Teflon coating for floppy disks
 Advanced Azo Dye Technology (patented Azo-Color technology), first developed 1994
 SERL (Super Eutectic Recording Layer) technology for rewritable media (after deleting the medium it regenerates)
 TERL (Tellurium Alloy Recording Layer) technology for special audio CD-RWs
 MABL for Blu-ray discs

See also
 List of optical disc manufacturers

References

External links

 

1969 establishments in North Carolina
Companies based in Charlotte, North Carolina
Computer companies established in 1969
Computer companies disestablished in 1985
Defunct computer companies of the United States
Computer storage companies
Mitsubishi Chemical Holdings
1985 mergers and acquisitions
1990 mergers and acquisitions
2020 mergers and acquisitions